Horacio Zeballos was the defending champion, but chose not to participate.

Guido Pella won the title, defeating Jason Kubler in the final, 6–2, 6–4.

Seeds

Draw

Finals

Top half

Bottom half

References
 Main Draw
 Qualifying Draw

Lima Challenger - Singles
Lima Challenger